The E5 European long distance path or E5 path is one of the European long-distance paths from the French Atlantic coast in Brittany through Switzerland, Austria and Germany over the Alps to Venice in Italy. It is waymarked over the whole 3200 km (1988 mi) distance. The heaviest used section is the last part, which crosses Europe’s highest mountains from Lake Constance to Italy (600 km, around 30 days).  Even this part does not require climbing experience.

France

The E5 route starts at Pointe du Raz in the north-west of France.  It initially follows the Channel coast, then runs inland past Versailles and follows the Seine to Dijon. After traversing the Vosges the trail reaches Lake Constance.

Switzerland

The E5 passes the Rhine Falls, then follows the southern shore of Lake Constance to Rheineck.

Austria

The trail heads east from Bregenz, then ascends to the Staufner hut and the German border.

Germany

Most E5 walkers start from Oberstdorf, where the Alpine section begins.  After 50 km the trail crosses the Austrian border after the Kemptner hut.

External links
 European Ramblers Association data on E5 in Germany

Austria

The most strenuous and spectacular part of the track (175 km) crosses the Allgäu, Lechtal and Ötztal Alps.  The route leads the traveller past the Memminger hut towards Zams and afterwards over Geigenkamm and Kaunergrat to Pitztal.  Beyond Mittelberg the route crosses Pitztaler Joch, the highest point of the trail (2995m), before reaching the Italian border near the Timmelsjoch.

External links
 European Ramblers Association data on E5 in Austria

Italy

The E5 now goes past the Heilig Kreuz Spitze and the Hohe Warte to Merano and Bolzano. The trail is then less mountainous and less crowded, but there are still more than 12 hard days of walking to Verona. The track leads the traveller along the west flank of the Dolomites past the health resort of Levico Terme and over the history-charged Pasúbio massif towards the final destination, Verona.

See also
 E5 at Outdoorwiki (German)

External links 
 E5 at the European Ramblers' Association
 Why E5?

Hiking trails in France
Hiking trails in Switzerland
Hiking_trails_in_Germany
European long-distance paths